Kennedy Musonda (born 22 December 1994) is a Zambian professional footballer who plays as a striker for Tanzanian Premier League club Young Africans.

References

1994 births
Living people
Zambian footballers
Zambia international footballers
Lusaka Dynamos F.C. players
Nakambala Leopards F.C. players
Zanaco F.C. players
Green Eagles F.C. players
Power Dynamos F.C. players
Association football forwards